Sergio Leone (3 January 1929 – 30 April 1989) was an Italian film director, producer and screenwriter.

Filmography

Main works

Assistant director 
 Il trovatore (1949)
 La forza del destino (1949)
 Night Taxi (1950)
 Il voto (1950)
 Il brigante Musolino (1950)
 The Three Pirates (1952)
 Jolanda, the Daughter of the Black Corsair (1952)
 The Mad Marechiaro (1952)
 Girls Marked Danger (1952)
 Man, Beast and Virtue (1953)
 Frine, Courtesan of Orient (1953)
 Tradita (1954)
 Of Life and Love (1954)
 They Stole a Tram (1954)
 La ladra (1955)
 Allow Me, Daddy! (1956)
 Il maestro... (1957)
 Slave Women of Corinth (1958)
 La legge mi incolpa (1959)
 Son of the Red Corsair (1959)
 Sodom and Gomorrah (1962)

Second unit director 
 Quo Vadis (1951) (uncredited)
 Helen of Troy (1956) (uncredited)
 Ben-Hur (1959) (uncredited)
 Sodom and Gomorrah (1962) (uncredited)
 Cemetery Without Crosses (1969) (director: dining scene - uncredited)
 My Name Is Nobody (1973) (uncredited)
 A Genius, Two Partners and a Dupe (1975) (director: opening scene - uncredited)

Screenwriter 
 Slave Women of Corinth (1958)
 Sheba and the Gladiator (1959)
 The Seven Revenges (1961)
 Duel of the Titans (1961)
 Slave Girls of Sheba (1964)
 Troppo forte (1986)

Executive producer 
 My Name Is Nobody (1973) (uncredited)
 A Genius, Two Partners and a Dupe (1975) (uncredited)
 The Cat (1977)
 A Dangerous Toy (1979) (uncredited)
 Troppo forte (1986) (uncredited)

Acting roles 
 The Man on the Street (1941)
 Bicycle Thieves (1948) (uncredited)
 Milano miliardaria (1951) (uncredited)
 The Mad Marechiaro (1952)
 They Stole a Tram (1954)
 For a Few Dollars More (1965) (voice) (uncredited)
 An Almost Perfect Affair (1979) (uncredited)
 Sad Hill Unearthed (2017) (archive footage)

References 

Leone, Sergio